Luther Blue (born October 21, 1954) is a former professional American football player who played wide receiver for the Detroit Lions and Philadelphia Eagles.

References

External links
Just Sports Stats

1954 births
American football wide receivers
Detroit Lions players
Philadelphia Eagles players
Iowa State Cyclones football players
Living people
People from Valdosta, Georgia
Players of American football from Georgia (U.S. state)
Canadian football wide receivers
African-American players of American football
African-American players of Canadian football
Toronto Argonauts players
21st-century African-American people
20th-century African-American sportspeople